Siriwan Bhudvanbhen (born 20 May 1967) is a Thai sports shooter. She competed in the women's 10 metre air rifle event at the 1984 Summer Olympics.

References

External links
 

1967 births
Living people
Siriwan Bhudvanbhen
Siriwan Bhudvanbhen
Shooters at the 1984 Summer Olympics
Place of birth missing (living people)